The Jed River is a river of New Zealand's South Island. It flows to the Pacific Ocean close to the town of Cheviot adjacent to Gore Bay. It combines with Buxton Creek behind a rocky beach before draining through the shingle. The waterways break through the rocks after heavy rain and establish a direct outflow into the sea.

See also
List of rivers of New Zealand

References

Rivers of Canterbury, New Zealand
Rivers of New Zealand